Sageretia theezans (sageretia, mock buckthorn, sweet-plum or Chinese sweet plum) is a shrub from the family Rhamnaceae, native to southern China. It is widely used for creating bonsai.

Description
It grows to 1–3 m tall and has small green leaves 1.5–4 cm long, and a leathery multicoloured trunk. It is evergreen and the flowers are small and inconspicuous; the fruit is a small edible drupe 1 cm diameter.

References

theezans
Flora of China
Flora of South Korea